Gross Rosebel Airstrip  serves the Gross Rosebel mine, in the Brokopondo District of Suriname. The Rosebel concession owns this airstrip.  The airstrip is mostly used for emergencies and charters.

Security personnel are responsible for airstrip maintenance and lighting as well as aircraft scheduling and communication with the Suriname civil aviation authorities. The site communication package is equipped with an air to ground Unicom channel that links into site mobile radios. This provides aircraft with the ability to give notice of arrival and to direct ground vehicles off the runway.

Rosebel is Canadian firm Cambior's most important asset. Rosebel employs 1260 people and has a projected mine life of 12 years (until 2022). However, the exploration potential is still high and it is expected that new mineral reserves will be added in the future.

Charters and destinations
Charter Airlines serving this airport are:

See also

 List of airports in Suriname
 Transport in Suriname

References

External links
OpenStreetMap - Rosebel

Airports in Suriname